Mary Bridget Ryan (31 January 1898 – 8 February 1981) was an Irish Fianna Fáil politician. She was a member of Cumann na mBan and a founder member of Fianna Fáil.

She was first elected to Dáil Éireann as a Fianna Fáil Teachta Dála (TD) for the Tipperary constituency at the 1944 general election. Her husband Martin Ryan was a TD for the same constituency from 1933 until his death in 1943. After boundary changes, she was returned at the 1948 general election for Tipperary North, and re-elected at the 1951, 1954 and 1957 general elections.

At the 1961 general election, she lost her seat to Fine Gael's Thomas Dunne.

See also
Families in the Oireachtas

References

1898 births
1981 deaths
Fianna Fáil TDs
Irish farmers
Members of the 12th Dáil
Members of the 13th Dáil
Members of the 14th Dáil
Members of the 15th Dáil
Members of the 16th Dáil
20th-century women Teachtaí Dála
Politicians from County Tipperary
Spouses of Irish politicians